The 7.92×33mm Kurz (designated as the 7.92 x 33 kurz by the C.I.P.) is a rimless bottlenecked intermediate rifle cartridge developed in Nazi Germany prior to and during World War II, specifically intended for development of the Sturmgewehr 44 (assault rifle). The ammunition is also referred to as 7.9mm Kurz ( meaning "short"), 7.9 Kurz,  7.9mmK, or 8×33 Polte. The round was developed as a compromise between the longer 7.92×57mm full-power rifle cartridge and the 9×19mm Parabellum pistol cartridge, and is the first mass-used intermediate cartridge in the world.

Cartridge dimensions
The 7.92×33mm Kurz has a 2.22 ml (34.3 grain H2O) cartridge case capacity.

7.92×33mm Kurz maximum C.I.P. cartridge dimensions. All sizes in millimeters (mm).

Americans define the shoulder angle at alpha/2 ≈ 17.5 degrees.
The common rifling twist rate for this cartridge is 240 mm (1 in 9.45 in), four grooves, Ø lands = , Ø grooves = , land width =  and the primer type is Berdan or boxer (in large rifle size).

According to the official Commission Internationale Permanente pour l'Epreuve des Armes à Feu Portatives (C.I.P.)  rulings, the 7.92×33mm Kurz can handle up to  Pmax piezo pressure. In C.I.P. regulated countries every rifle-cartridge combination has to be proofed at 125% of this maximum C.I.P. pressure to certify for sale to consumers.
This means that 7.92×33mm Kurz chambered arms in C.I.P. regulated countries were, as of 2014, proof tested at  PE piezo pressure.

Military designation 
In German military instructions, the caliber was often deemed unimportant; the name was emphasized. This was part of the same duplicity under which the StG44 was originally designated as a "machine pistol" to disguise the true nature of the weapon from Hitler. After the eventual approval and acceptance of the Sturmgewehr 44, it was redesignated as the "short cartridge model 1943".

Background

The cartridge was the same caliber, and had the same base diameter, as the 7.92×57mm, which was employed by the standard German Army infantry rifle, the Karabiner 98k, as well as its machine guns. The German armed forces had issued a 7.92×57mm automatic (select fire) rifle, the FG 42, in limited numbers, but the heavy recoil of the round made it difficult to use effectively in this role.

What was needed was a cartridge that could be used in a lighter, more maneuverable rifle to bridge the gap between submachine guns and rifles. This meant it could be fired effectively from a weapon that weighed less than a machine gun, yet still had much greater range, velocity, and stopping power than the 9×19mm Parabellum which was standard in German submachine guns. The 34% weight reduction compared to full-length 7.92×57mm Mauser s.S. ball ammunition meant that a soldier could carry more rounds of ammunition, for an increase in sustained suppressive fire capability.

The shortage of brass in the later stages of World War II led to the use of steel cases for this new cartridge. The Kurz cartridge incorporated more taper than the parent case to increase reliability in feed from magazines (and because the cartridge retained the same base diameter and caliber as the longer, full-size round, requiring a more abrupt taper). This led to the distinctive curved magazine for weapons that used this cartridge, which became popularly known as "banana magazine", due to their curved shape, and which can be seen on other weapons using distinctly tapered cartridges, like the 7.62×39mm chambered in Kalashnikov rifles. The steel cases were typically lacquer-coated to prevent corrosion.
Most projectile variants featured a boat tail and bullets designated with m.E. - mit Eisenkern ("with iron core") mild steel cored projectiles were developed to save on lead and other metals that became scarce in Germany during World War II.

Cartridge variants
During World War II the 7.92×33mm Kurz round was produced in a relative limited amount of variants, when compared to the full-power 7.92×57mm Mauser round.
The German military used 7,9mm as designation and generally omitted any diameter reference and only printed the exact type of loading on ammunition boxes during World War II. Ammunition boxes can have i.L. or in Ladestreifen added, meaning the containing 7.92×33mm Kurz rounds are provided in stripper clips.

Pist. Patrone 43 m.E.
These were m.E. - mit Eisenkern ("with iron core") — mild steel cored projectile with a ballistic coefficient of approximately 0.132 (G7 BC) rounds.
Pist. Patr. 43 L'spur
These were L'spur - Leuchtspur ("tracer") projectile rounds.
Pist. Patr. m.E.L'spur
These were m.E.L'spur - mit Eisenkern Leuchtspur ("with iron core tracer") projectile rounds.
Pist. Platzpatr. 43
These were Platz ("blank") rounds.
Pist. Treibpatrone 43
These were Treib ("booster charge for rifle granades") rounds.
Pist. Expatrone 43
These were Exerzier ("drill") inert rounds for aiming exercises.
Pist. Werkzeugpatrone
These were Werkzeugpatrone ("toolcartridge") inert rounds for examining the functioning of a firearms action.

Firearms

Prior to the development of the Kurz round and its associated weapons, two basic small arms existed to equip the regular infantryman, the bolt-action rifle and the submachine gun. The bolt-action rifle was the standard small arm for most of the world's armies, usually incorporating good accuracy and stopping power, but with a very limited rate of fire. The submachine gun was a newer piece of equipment, which offered a very high rate of fire, and a compact size, but was of very limited range and stopping power due to the pistol round (usually 9 mm) it fired. As an effective, intermediate-sized cartridge, the 7.92×33mm Kurz round was a key evolution in the development of the assault rifle by providing a combination of controllable automatic fire and acceptable accuracy at ranges most likely to see infantry combat.

Only a few weapons used this round, most notably the Sturmgewehr 44 – the first assault rifle to be accepted into widespread service and put into mass production – and the Gustloff Volkssturmgewehr. A number of weapons in development at the time also used the cartridge, including the Sturmgewehr 45, HIW VSK, Wimmersperg Spz-kr, Grossfuss Sturmgewehr; and a number of German and Czech  prototype weapons made during World War II and a small number of prototype weapons made in other countries after the war. An unknown number of late-war K43 rifles were chambered for this cartridge and modified to accept MP 44 magazines. Variants of the VK 98 (Volks-Karabiner), a so-called last-ditch bolt-action rifle intended for the Volkssturm Home Guard, were also chambered for this cartridge with unknown quantities produced by Mauser and Steyr.

A number of Karabiner 98 rifles have appeared for sale on the European market in this caliber with "NUR FÜR KURZ PATRONE" (only for short cartridge) stamped on the barrel. While there were a few Karabiner 98 rifles made in this caliber for testing during the war, these rifles are deemed by specialists and collectors to have been rechambered post-war.

A small number of Remington XP-100 bolt-action target pistols were made in 7.92×33mm Kurz.

Lothar-Walther manufactures new Mauser 98 barrels chambered in 7.92×33mm Kurz.

Schwaben Arms GmbH of Rottweil, Germany offers newly made K98K rifles in 7.92×33mm Kurz (also known as 8x33 in Europe) in addition to 8mm Mauser and 7.62x51mm NATO.

Post-World War II

After World War II, the cartridge was tested and used in prototype rifles in Argentina and Belgium, amongst other nations, during the late 1940s and early 1950s. The first FN FAL prototype was designed to fire the cartridge when NATO was organized. After the war it was manufactured by East Germany (the German Democratic Republic), the Czechoslovak Socialist Republic, and Egypt.

Spain continued development after the war, creating a few variants of the cartridge, such as tracer rounds, boat-tailed rounds and slightly shorter bullets that have a lead core. These developments were encouraged by Calzada Bayo, a Spanish lieutenant colonel. However, they were cancelled in favour of a more radical cartridge, 7.92×40mm CETME. Finally, Spanish CETME rifles were chambered for a variant of the 7.62×51mm NATO round.

Demand for the ammunition still exists, as the StG 44 is still in use by some within the Lebanese Forces militia, Djibouti and Pakistan  as well as irregular forces in some countries in the Horn of Africa and the Middle East, where captured German arms were distributed as military aid by Eastern Bloc countries as well as Yugoslavia. It is currently manufactured by the Prvi Partizan factory in Užice, Serbia. There is also some demand on the private collectors' market; reloadable cartridge cases can be produced by resizing and trimming 7.62×51mm NATO cases, and Hornady makes a 125-grain  bullet for this caliber suitable for handloads.

In Pakistan, the same cartridge is also reported to be in use by the local name of "44 Bore." This either refers to the 44 of the MP44/StG44 series or the "L44A1" inscription found on the headstamps on necked-down 7.62×51mm cartridge cases. It is used in locally made AK-pattern weapons in semi-automatic only (produced or converted in Peshawer, Kohat and Derra Adam Khel, etc.) that chamber this cartridge, since 7.62×39mm is a restricted caliber (known as "prohibited bore" or "PB" in Pakistan). These AK-pattern weapons are usually considered inferior due to inconsistent gunsmithing of weapons chambered or converted for this cartridge and lack of quality control of the ammunition. It is sometimes used by private security companies. The usage of 7.92 mm bullets in 7.62 mm barrels without reboring is not considered to be a safe practice.

See also
 8 mm caliber
 Calzada Bayo CB-57
 List of rifle cartridges
 Table of handgun and rifle cartridges

References

Further reading
 Kapell, Dr. Dieter, Die deutsche Kurzpatrone 7,92×33, Books on Demand GmbH, Norderstedt Germany, 2007
 Handrich, Hans-Dieter, Sturmgewehr! From Firepower to Striking Power, Collector Grade Publications Inc., Cobourg, Canada, 2004

Pistol and rifle cartridges
Military cartridges
Weapons and ammunition introduced in 1943